60S ribosomal protein L38 is a protein that in humans is encoded by the RPL38 gene.

Gene 
The human RPL38 gene resides on the long arm of chromosome 17 at 17q25.1.  It consists of five exons spread out over a distance of 6223 bp.  The 213 nucleotide open reading frame encodes a 70 amino acid protein. Alternative splice variants have been identified, both encoding the same protein. As is typical for genes encoding ribosomal proteins, there are multiple processed pseudogenes of this gene dispersed through the genome, including one located in the promoter region of the angiotensin II receptor type 1 gene.

Function 

Ribosomes, the organelles that catalyze protein synthesis, consist of a small 40S subunit and a large 60S subunit. Together these subunits are composed of 4 RNA species and approximately 80 structurally distinct proteins. This gene encodes a ribosomal protein that is a component of the 60S subunit. The protein belongs to the L38E family of ribosomal proteins. It is located in the cytoplasm.

Genetics

An ~18kbp deletion, encompassing the entire Rpl38 locus underlies the phenotype in the Tail-short (Ts) mutant mouse. In homozygous state, Ts mice die at around 3–4 days of gestation. Ts/+ heterozygous embryos undergo an anemia and develop skeletal malformations. During the perinatal period ~30% of the heterozygotes die.  The surviving heterozygous Ts exhibit great variations of shortened, kinked and otherwise malformed tails. They also weigh less than their wild-type littermates but have otherwise a normal life span.  Additionally, Ts mice develop a conductive hearing loss shortly after the onset of hearing at around 3–4 weeks of age.  The hearing loss is the result of ectopic ossification along the round window ridge at the outside of the cochlea, massive deposition of cholesterol crystals in the middle ear cavity, an enlarged Eustachian tube and a chronic otitis media with effusion.

In Drosophila melanogaster, loss-of-function alleles of RPL38, cause embryonic lethality in homozygotes and protracted growth and shortened bristles in heterozygotes.  Due to the haplo-insufficient nature of the mutation, the phenotype is inherited as a dominant trait.

In humans, mutations in ribosomal proteins cause Diamond-Blackfan Anemia.  However, no disease has yet been linked to mutations in human RPL38.

References

External links

Further reading

Ribosomal proteins